The following is a list of current United States governors by age.

State governors

Territorial governors

Mayors of federal districts

Demographics of state governors 

Note: The following information for currently serving state governors is correct as of 2021.

 Statistics (not counting territorial governors):

 Age Ranges:
 11 governors are in their 70s;
 20 governors are in their 60s;
 12 governors are in their 50s; and
 7 governors are in their 40s.

 Political Party:
 28 Republicans (56%)
 22 Democrats (44%)

 Sex:
 41 Males (82%)
 9 Females (18%)

See also
 List of current United States lieutenant governors by age
 List of current United States governors

References

Governors
Lists of current office-holders of country subdivisions
Lists of political office-holders by age
 Current age